Hector Gray (born January 2, 1957) is a former American football defensive back. He played for the Detroit Lions from 1981 to 1983.

References

1957 births
Living people
American football defensive backs
Florida State Seminoles football players
Detroit Lions players